Dead Wake: The Last Crossing of the Lusitania is a 2015 New York Times non-fiction bestseller written by author Erik Larson. The book looks at the sinking of Lusitania during World War I and the events surrounding the sinking.

Awards
The book was named Book of the Year in the History Category by World Magazine. It won the Goodreads Choice Award for History & Biography in 2015.

Reception
According to Amazon, Dead Wake was one of the 10 bestselling books of 2015.

References

External links 
 Book Page on Author's Official Website
 The New York Times Book Review
Q&A interview with Larson on Dead Wake, March 29, 2015, C-SPAN
Presentation by Larson on Dead Wake, March 27, 2015, C-SPAN
Presentation by Larson on Dead Wake, June 6, 2015, C-SPAN

2015 non-fiction books
World War I books
Crown Publishing Group books
RMS Lusitania
Books of maritime history